Theodosia Arm is a locality in the Desolation Sound area of the South Coast region of British Columbia, Canada, located at the head of Thors Cove, an arm of Malaspina Inlet, near the outlet of Theodosia Inlet.

See also
List of settlements in British Columbia
Theodosia (disambiguation)

References

Unincorporated settlements in British Columbia
Sunshine Coast (British Columbia)